Bönsch (also Boensch) is a German language surname. Notable people with the name include:

 Eugen Bönsch (1897–1951), Austro-Hungarian World War I flying ace
 Fred Boensch (1920–2000), American football player
 Hord Boensch (1893–1924), American college football player
 Bonsch, or Bon-Chan (ages back - current), Professional Mobile Royale Player - sometimes bullied by fellow guildmates.

See also 
 Bönnsch dialect

German-language surnames
Surnames from given names